Sergio Ignacio Salazar López (born March 23, 1986 in Medellín) is a Colombian professional BMX cyclist. He represented his nation Colombia at the 2008 Summer Olympics, and has claimed multiple Colombian national titles to his career resume in the men's elite category. Salazar currently races and trains professionally for GW Shimano BMX Cycling Team, under his personal coach Jorge Wilson Jaramillo.

Salazar qualified for the Colombian squad, along with Andrés Jiménez Caicedo and Augusto Castro, in men's BMX cycling at the 2008 Summer Olympics in Beijing by receiving one of the nation's three available berths from the Union Cycliste Internationale based on his top-ten performance in the BMX World Rankings. Salazar started his morning session by grabbing the sixth prelims seed in 36.145 seconds, but he could not match a more stellar ride in his quarterfinal heat with 15 positioning points and a fifth-place finish, narrowly missing out the semifinals by a two-point deficit.

References

External links
NBC 2008 Olympics profile

1986 births
Living people
Colombian male cyclists
BMX riders
Cyclists at the 2008 Summer Olympics
Olympic cyclists of Colombia
Sportspeople from Medellín
21st-century Colombian people
Competitors at the 2010 Central American and Caribbean Games